Gragareth is a mountain straddling the border between Lancashire and North Yorkshire in England. At , its summit is the second highest point in the post-1974 county of Lancashire. The summit of Gragareth lies about 200 m west of the county boundary, but inside the 2016 border of Yorkshire Dales National Park. The western slopes are known as Leck Fell and the southern slopes form Ireby Fell.

The summit has a trig point and extensive views towards Morecambe Bay, the Lake District fells, the Howgill Fells, Ingleborough and the Forest of Bowland. The county boundary wall running along the ridge is believed to be "one of the highest dry stone walls in the country." Historically it formed the boundary between the West Riding of Yorkshire and Westmorland. The Three Men of Gragareth are a group of tall cairns on the western side of the hill above Leck Fell House.

The fell contains several caves including Lost John's Cave, Rumbling Hole and Ireby Fell Cavern.

Wainwright includes "The ascent of Gragareth via Leck Fell returning via Ireby Fell" in his Walks in Limestone Country. His route begins at Ireby village, following a lane from Todgill Farm on the Leck road to the tarmac road which leads to Leck Fell House, then "a steep scramble" up past the Three Men.  His descent route is down a long enclosure formed by the county boundary to the east and the almost-parallel boundary between Leck and Ireby parishes, dropping down Ireby Fell past the opening of Ireby Fell Cavern, to return to Ireby.

References

External links 

 Walk route to the Trig. Point and the Three Men of Gragareth

Mountains and hills of Lancashire
Hewitts of England
Geography of the City of Lancaster
Highest points of English counties